The Northern Ireland (St Andrews Agreement) Act 2006 (c 53) is an Act of the Parliament of the United Kingdom. It implemented the St Andrews Agreement. It is modified by section 1 of the Northern Ireland (St Andrews Agreement) Act 2007.

Part 2 - Amendments of the Northern Ireland Act 1998 etc

Section 5 - The Executive Committee and the Ministerial Code
Section 5(1) inserts section 20(4) of the Northern Ireland Act 1998.

Section 5(2) inserts section 28A of that Act.

Section 6 - Power to refer Ministerial decision to Executive Committee
This section inserts section 28B of the Northern Ireland Act 1998.

Section 7 - Pledge of office
This section amends Schedule 4 to the Northern Ireland Act 1998.

Section 8 - First Minister, deputy First Minister and Northern Ireland Ministers
This section substitutes sections 16A to 16C, for section 16, of the Northern Ireland Act 1998.

Section 9 - Department with policing and justice functions: nomination etc of Ministers
This section provides that Schedule 6 has effect.

Section 10 - Statutory committee for Office of First Minister and deputy First Minister
This section amends section 29 of the Northern Ireland Act 1998.

Section 11 - Committee to review functioning of Assembly and Executive Committee
Section 11(1) inserts sections 29A and 29B of the Northern Ireland Act 1998.

Section 12 - North-South Ministerial Council and British-Irish Council
This section substitutes new sections 52A to 52C for the existing section 52 of the Northern Ireland Act 1998.

Section 13 - Community designation
This section inserts section 4(5A) of the Northern Ireland Act 1998.

Section 14 - Power of Executive Committee to call for witnesses and documents
This section inserts section 28C of the Northern Ireland Act 1998.

Section 15 - Strategies relating to Irish language and Ulster Scots language etc
This section inserts section 28D of the Northern Ireland Act 1998.

Section 16 - Strategy relating to poverty, social exclusion etc
This section inserts section 28E of the Northern Ireland Act 1998.

Section 17 - Vacancy in the Assembly
This section inserts paragraph 5 of Schedule 6 to the Northern Ireland Act 1998.

Section 19 - Minor and consequential amendments
This section provides that Schedule 7 has effect.

Part 3 - Other amendments

Section 20 - District policing partnerships
This section provides that Schedules 8 and 9 have effect.

This section is prospectively repealed by Part 2 of Schedule 8 to the Justice Act (Northern Ireland) 2011.

Section 21 - Amendment of Education (Northern Ireland) Order 2006 etc
Section 21(1) substitutes articles 1(6)(a) and (b) of the Education (Northern Ireland) Order 2006 (S.I. 2006/1915 (N.I. 11).

Section 21(2) amends article 16(5) of the Education (Northern Ireland) Order 1997 (S.I. 1997/866 (N.I. 5)).

Part 4 Supplemental

Section 22 - Repeal of the 2006 Act
This section repeals the Northern Ireland Act 2006.

Section 27 - Commencement
Section 27(6) is prospectively repealed by Part 2 of Schedule 8 to the Justice Act (Northern Ireland) 2011.

Orders made under this section
The Northern Ireland (St Andrews Agreement) Act 2006 (Commencement No.1) Order 2007 (S.I. 2007/92 (C.4)) was made under section 27(3)(a).
The Northern Ireland (St Andrews Agreement) Act 2006 (Commencement No.2) Order 2007 (S.I. 2007/2491 (C.94)) was made under section 27(3)(b).
The power under section 27(6) was exercised by article 3 of the Police (Northern Ireland) Act 2003 (Commencement No.2) Order 2007 (S.I. 2007/371 (C.26))

Sechedule 8 - Reconstitution of district policing partnerships
This Schedule is prospectively repealed by Part 2 of Schedule 8 to the Justice Act (Northern Ireland) 2011.

Schedule 9 - District policing partnerships: Belfast sub-groups
This Schedule is prospectively repealed by Part 2 of Schedule 8 to the Justice (Northern Ireland) Act 2011.

See also
Northern Ireland Act

References
Halsbury's Statutes,

External links
The Northern Ireland (St Andrews Agreement) Act 2006, as amended from the National Archives.
The Northern Ireland (St Andrews Agreement) Act 2006, as originally enacted from the National Archives.
Explanatory notes to the Northern Ireland (St Andrews Agreement) Act 2006.

United Kingdom Acts of Parliament 2006
Acts of the Parliament of the United Kingdom concerning Northern Ireland
2006 in Northern Ireland
Northern Ireland devolution